The Animation Writers Caucus Animation Writing Award is a special award given to a member of the Writers Guild of America, West given to that member of the Animation Writers Caucus and/or the Guild who, in the opinion of the Board of Directors, has advanced the literature of animation in film and/or television through the years and who has made outstanding contributions to the profession of the animation writer.

Recipients

References 

Writers Guild of America